R1 is an expressway in Slovakia. It starts near Trnava and ends in Ružomberok and it goes through or around Sereď, Nitra, Zlaté Moravce, Hronský Beňadik, Nová Baňa, Žarnovica, Žiar nad Hronom, Zvolen and Banská Bystrica.

The former partial designation of this route was D65.

Currently, continuous section between Trnava and bypass of Banská Bystrica is in operation. A linking section to Ružomberok and consequently back to motorway D1 has been planned since 2008. Both sections, Nitra - Hronský Beňadik and bypass of Banská Bystrica, were built, and are operated under the conditions of a Public-private partnership project, unlike the rest of Slovak motorway and expressway network.

Sections of the expressway

See also

 Highways in Slovakia
 Controlled-access highway
 Transport in Slovakia

External links
 Highways portal by INEKO Institute (slovak)
 Exits of expressway R1
 Site of the PPP operator (slovak)
 https://ww-w.ndsas.sk/narodna-dialnicna-spolocnost

Highways in Slovakia